Gabriel Escobar may refer to:

 Gabriel Escobar (footballer), Salvadoran footballer
 Gabriel Escobar (boxer), Spanish boxer